Simple Things (translit. Prosty'e veshchi)  is a 2007 Russian comedy-drama film. Written and directed by Alexei Popogrebski, the film stars Sergei Puskepalis and Leonid Bronevoy.

The film was nominated for the Golden Eagle Award for Best Motion Picture and won Best Screenplay. Popogrebski and Bronevoy were also nominated for Best Director and Best Supporting Actor, respectively. Bronevoy also won a Nika Award for Best Supporting Actor.

Plot
A dying actor (Bronevoy) asks a doctor (Puskepalis) to help him commit suicide in exchange for a painting masterpiece.

Cast
 Sergei Puskepalis as Sergei Maslov
 Leonid Bronevoy as Zhuravlyov
 Svetlana Kamynina as Katya
 Dinara Kutuyevam as Lena
 Ivan Osipov as Pyotr
 Malkhaz Zhvaniya as Georgy

References

External links

 Simple Things (Простые вещи) at russiancinema.ru 

2007 films
2007 comedy-drama films
Russian comedy-drama films
Assisted suicide